A leadership election for Christian and Democratic Union – Czechoslovak People's Party (KDU-ČSL) was held on 8 June 2013. Pavel Bělobrádek was reelected as the leader of KDU-ČSL. Zuzana Roithová and Marian Jurečka were nominated for the position but both of them withdrew from election. Bělobrádek ran unopposed and received 244 of 272 votes.

References

KDU-ČSL leadership elections
Indirect elections
2013 elections in the Czech Republic
Christian and Democratic Union - Czechoslovak People's Party leadership election
June 2013 events in Europe